The Buick Automobile Company Building, at 216 Admiral Blvd. in Kansas City, Missouri, was built in 1907.  It was listed on the National Register of Historic Places in 2004.

It is a three-story brick building with elements of Tudor Revival style.  It is supported bycast-iron columns, steel girders and heavy timbered joists, and was designed by architect Frank S. Rea.   A three-story brick addition was added around 1934, and a two-story extension to the rear was added in 1958.

The building included an automobile showroom on the first floor, auto repair shops in the basement and on the third floor, and a garage on the second floor.

References

Auto dealerships on the National Register of Historic Places
National Register of Historic Places in Jackson County, Missouri
Tudor Revival architecture in the United States
Buildings and structures completed in 1907
Buick